Sdiri is a Tunisian surname. It may refer to:

Hayfa Sdiri (born 1997), Tunisian entrepreneur
Houssem Eddine Sdiri (born 1987), Tunisian footballer
Salim Sdiri (born 1978), French long jumper

Surnames of Tunisian origin